Pelochyta gandolfii is a moth of the family Erebidae. It was described by William Schaus in 1933. It is found in Bolivia.

References

Pelochyta
Moths described in 1933